John Crescentius also John II Crescentius or Crescentius III (d. 1012) was the son of Crescentius the Younger (Crescentius II). He succeeded to his father's title of consul and patrician of Rome in 1002 and held it to his death.

Early in 1001, a revolt broke out in Rome against the Emperor Otto III, who now permanently resided in Rome. The Emperor and Pope Sylvester II, the first pope of French nationality, were compelled to flee; it is quite likely that John Crescentius was the prime mover of the rebellion.

At any rate, after this he assumed supreme authority in Rome, and after the death of the Emperor Otto III on 24 January 1002 took the title of Patricius Romanorum. Sylvester was permitted to return to Rome, but had little to do with the temporal government. The same is true of his three immediate successors: John XVII (1003), John XVIII (1003–09), and Sergius IV (1009–12), all of whom were appointed through the influence of John Crescentius. There had not been any further imperial coronations during the rest of his life. John Crescentius died in May 1012, and with him the Crescentii disappeared from the history of Rome.

Notes

References

10th-century births
1012 deaths
People of medieval Rome
11th-century Italian nobility